The Loyalty Effect is a 1996 book by Fred Reichheld of the consulting firm Bain & Company, and the book's title is also sometimes used to refer to the broader loyalty business model as a whole. Reichheld's book was exceptionally popular with marketing and customer relationship management professionals, and as such the phrase "loyalty effect" has become synonymous in some circles with the more generic concepts covered by the loyalty business model.

In 2001, Reichheld penned a sequel to the book called Loyalty Rules! and released a revised edition of the original work.

References

 Reichheld, Frederick F. The Loyalty Effect, Harvard Business School Press, 1996. (Revised 2001)
 Reichheld, Frederick F. Loyalty Rules!, Harvard Business School Press, 2001.

External links
 Reichheld's site for The Loyalty Effect and Loyalty Rules!
 Net Promoter Overview about Reichheld's findings in The Loyalty Effect.

Business terms
Business books
1996 non-fiction books
Harvard Business Publishing books